MKFC Stockholm College is a folk high school in Stockholm. It began its operations as Rinkeby Folk High School. MKFC stands for multi-cultural adult education center and it is also the focus of the school. MKFC is the only folk high school in Sweden with online education. Work on distance learning on the Internet has been underway since 1997. The folk high school has moved its offices and is now found in Hötorget skyscrapers.

Multicultural Adult Education Centre, MKFC was founded in 1991 in Rinkeby which is a densely populated suburb of Stockholm. MKFC started the Rinkeby Folk high school whose values were based on MKFC's view of knowledge creation in collaboration with the local civil society and the public sector, and public education for everyone. The goal of adult education was that participants should become active democratic citizens who could support themselves. An important tool from the start was the computer that other, better established citizens at that time already had in their workplaces or at home. Computerization and the Internet allowed the college to become popular even outside Rinkeby. In the late 1990s when the number of participants was more than 1,000 students the buildings used were over 7000 square meters with 400 computers. Internet and the learning platforms that MKFC used as the first folk high school radically improved the accessibility to all studies regardless of where the students lived and what times of day they preferred to study.

External links
Official website

Folk high schools in Sweden
Education in Stockholm
Educational institutions established in 1991
1991 establishments in Sweden